Abhinav Shukla (born 27 September 1982) is an Indian actor who primarily works in Hindi television and films. He participated in Bigg Boss 14 and Fear Factor: Khatron Ke Khiladi 11 and emerged as semi finalist in the latter.

Early life and education
Shukla was born on 27 September 1982 in Ludhiana, Punjab. His father, Dr. K.K. Shukla, worked as an entomologist at Punjab Agricultural University in Ludhiana and his mother, Mrs. Radha Shukla was a teacher at Guru Nanak Public School (Sarabha Nagar, Ludhiana).

He graduated from Guru Nanak Public School in 2000, and completed his Bachelor of Technology in Electronics & Communication Engineering from Lala Lajpat Rai Institute of Engineering and Technology (Moga, Punjab) in 2004.

Career
Shukla started his career in the Indian television industry with Jersey No. 10 in 2007. Later in 2008, he played Shantanu in Colors TV's Jaane Kya Baat Hui. In 2009, he played Vikram in Zee TV's Chotti Bahu. In 2010, he was cast in Star One's Geet – Hui Sabse Parayi where he plays the role of Dev. In 2011, he left the show and was replaced by Samir Sharma

In 2011 to 2012, Shukla then was a part of the show Ek Hazaaron Mein Meri Behna Hai where he played Dr. Manan. In January 2012, he participated in Survivor India as a contestant and was voted out in episode 21. In April 2012 he played Sumer in Zee TV's Hitler Didi.

In 2013, he played a cameo in Zee TV's show Badalte Rishton Ki Dastaan. In 2014, he made his Bollywood debut with the film Roar: Tigers of the Sundarbans starring opposite Nora Fatehi, which released in October. Later in December 2014, he participated in Box Cricket League in its first season. In 2015, he made an episodic appearance as Vikram in MTV Big F.

In 2016, he participated in the second season of Box Cricket League. Later he entered Star Plus's Diya Aur Baati Hum playing the role of Om. In 2017, he appeared in the Colors TV's Kasam Tere Pyaar Ki playing the role of Vishal. He later acted in the film Aksar 2 opposite Gautam Rode and Zarine Khan.

In 2018 he opted to play a negative role on Colors TV show Silsila Badalte Rishton Ka as Rajdeep. He however quit the show later in November. In 2019, he acted in Luka Chuppi which released in March. He later participated in Khatra Khatra Khatra. He directed a short film based on female-foeticide Bareilly Ki Beti: The Youngest Survivor starring his wife Rubina Dilaik.<ref>{{cite web|url=https://www.news18.com/news/movies/rubina-dilaik-in-hubby-abhinav-shuklas-short-film-bareilly-ki-beti-the-youngest-survivor-2476919.html|title=Rubina Dilaik in hubby Abhinav Shuklas short film Bareilly Ki Beti |publisher=Outlook India|date=28 January 2020}}</ref> In 2020, he along with his wife Rubina Dilaik entered Colors TV's Bigg Boss 14 as a contestant. He got evicted on Day 130.

Personal life

Shukla married his longtime girlfriend, actress Rubina Dilaik on 21 June 2018 in Shimla.

On Bigg Boss 14'', Dilaik revealed, "I and Abhinav were going for a divorce and had given each other time till November and that is the reason we decided to enter Bigg Boss 14 together." Post the show, they decided to continue their marriage. Shukla mentioned, "Everything is fine now. There's no divorce happening. The show made us stronger and strengthened our bond."

Shukla who is a self-confessed adventure lover successfully climbed the peak of Stok Kangri in pure Alpine style along with his brother on 23 July 2017 and announced that this marked his foray into mountaineering. In 2016 he along with his brother completed a 7-day trek from Chandra Taal to Bara-lacha la in alpine style. A year before he had cycled from Manali to Leh solo in six days.

He is known for his outdoor and adventure activities, whenever not shooting or working he likes to trek and camp out in the woods. On 4 January 2014 while on a trek to a fort in Matheran forests of Maharashtra he got stuck on a ledge of a rock face and had to be rescued by a team of rock climbers. He said he had mentally prepared himself for days of survival, even had stored his urine for emergency.

In the media 
Shukla was ranked at No. 11 in The Times 20 Most Desirable Men on Television 2020.

Filmography

Films

Television

Special appearances

Web series

Dubbing roles

Music videos

Awards and nominations

References

External links

 
 

1982 births
Indian male television actors
Male actors from Ludhiana
Indian male models
Indian male soap opera actors
Punjabi people
Living people
Bigg Boss (Hindi TV series) contestants
Fear Factor: Khatron Ke Khiladi participants